Glenn Kessler is the name of:
Glenn Kessler (journalist) (born 1959), American journalist and Washington Post diplomatic correspondent
Glenn Kessler (screenwriter) (born 1970), American screenwriter and television producer